Preobrazhenovka is the name of several rural localities in Russia:
Preobrazhenovka, Zavitinsky District, Amur Oblast, a selo in Preobrazhenovsky Selsoviet of Zavitinsky District, Amur Oblast
Preobrazhenovka, Oktyabrsky District, Amur Oblast, a selo in Pereyaslovsky Selsoviet of Oktyabrsky District, Amur Oblast